Aluminium diboride (AlB2) is a chemical compound made from the metal aluminium and the metalloid boron. It is one of two compounds of aluminium and boron, the other being AlB12, which are both commonly referred to as aluminium boride.  

Structurally the B atoms form graphite-like sheets with Al atoms between them, and this is very similar to the structure of magnesium diboride. Single crystals of AlB2 exhibit metallic conductivity along the axis parallel to the basal hexagonal plane.

Aluminium boride is considered a hazardous substance as it reacts with acids and hydrogen gas to produce toxic gases. For example, it reacts with hydrochloric acid to release borane and aluminium chloride.

The crystal structure of AlB2 is often used as a prototype structure to describe intermetallic compounds. There are a large number of structure types that fall within the AlB2 structural family.

See also
Boride

References

External links
"Boron";

Borides
Aluminium compounds